David Bewicke-Copley (born 21 September 1997) is a British rower. He won the 2022 world championship title in the British men's eight after earlier winning gold that season at the 2022 European Rowing Championships.

References

External links

1997 births
Living people
British male rowers
World Rowing Championships medalists for Great Britain
21st-century British people